A user guide, also commonly known as a user manual, is intended to assist users in using a particular product, service or application. It's usually written by a technician, product developer, or a company's customer service staff.

Most user guides contain both a written guide and associated images.  In the case of computer applications, it is usual to include screenshots of the human-machine interface(s), and hardware manuals often include clear, simplified diagrams.  The language used is matched to the intended audience, with jargon kept to a minimum or explained thoroughly.

Contents of a user manual
The sections of a user manual often include:
A cover page
A title page and copyright page
A preface, containing details of related documents and information on how to navigate the user guide
A contents page
A Purpose section. This should be an overview rather than detail the objective of the document
An Audience section to explicitly state who is the intended audience who is required to read, including optionals
A Scope section is crucial as it also serves as a disclaimer, stating what is out-of-scope as well as what is covered
A guide on how to use at least the main function of the system
A troubleshooting section detailing possible errors or problems that may occur, along with how to fix them
A FAQ (Frequently Asked Questions)
Where to find further help, and contact details 
A glossary and, for larger documents, an index

History 

User guides have been found with ancient devices. One example is the Antikythera Mechanism, a 2,000 year old Greek analogue computer that was found off the coast of the Greek island Antikythera in the year 1900. On the cover of this device are passages of text which describe the features and operation of the mechanism.

As the software industry was developing, the question of how to best document software programs was undecided. This was a unique problem for software developers, since users often became frustrated with current help documents. Some considerations for writing a user guide that developed at this time include:

 the use of plain language
 length and reading difficulty
 the role of printed user guides for digital programs
 user-centered design

Computer software manuals and guides
User manuals and user guides for most non-trivial software applications are book-like documents with contents similar to the above list. They may be distributed either in print or electronically. Some documents have a more fluid structure with many internal links. The Google Earth User Guide is an example of this format. The term guide is often applied to a document that addresses a specific aspect of a software product. Some usages are Installation Guide, Getting Started Guide, and various How to guides. An example is the Picasa Getting Started Guide.

In some business software applications, where groups of users have access to only a sub-set of the application's full functionality, a user guide may be prepared for each group. An example of this approach is the Autodesk Topobase 2010 Help document, which contains separate Administrator Guides, User Guides, and a Developer's Guide.

See also 
 Owner's manual
Release notes
Moe book
Technical writer
Manual page (Unix)
Instruction manual (gaming)
Reference card
RTFM
HOWTO

References

Technical communication